Richard Hodgkinson (born 9 December 1983) is an English cricketer. He is a right-handed batsman and a right-arm medium-fast bowler.

Born in Mansfield, Hodgkinson joined Nottinghamshire in 2003, but failed to achieve a first-team debut for some time due to a serious ankle injury.

He left Nottinghamshire in 2005. In 2007, Hodgkinson played his first game for Derbyshire.

References

1983 births
Living people
English cricketers
Nottinghamshire cricketers
Derbyshire cricketers
Sportspeople from Mansfield
Cricketers from Nottinghamshire
Nottinghamshire Cricket Board cricketers